A. C. Guards is a locality in the city of Hyderabad, Telangana. The name A.C Guards stands for the African Cavalry Guards of Hyderabad State who were stationed there since the time of 6th Nizam Mahbub Ali Khan, Asaf Jah VI.

The barracks are believed be to have been constructed more than 100 years ago and the quarters of A.C Guards were allocated to the African (Siddi) soldiers of the Nizam's army. Masab Tank, Khairtabad are areas adjacent to A.C. Guards.

In the 19th century, the 6th Nizam, Mir Mahbub Ali Khan, heard of Africans serving in the court of another Indian nobleman. Impressed by their qualities, he asked for a batch of Africans to be brought to Hyderabad. A group of around 300 young men soon followed; most accounts indicate they came voluntarily. It is said that when it came to safeguarding his family, the 7th Nizam had absolute trust in these bodyguards.

Sports
 A.C. Guards Hockey Club
 Bhistiwada Youth Sports Club

References

External links
Hyderabad's African old guard
Video of Soldiers of NIZAMS of HYDERABAD
Location on Google Maps

Neighbourhoods in Hyderabad, India
Hyderabad State Forces
Siddhi people